Elen Shakirova (née Bunatyants, born 2 June 1970 in Mary, Turkmen SSR) is a Russian former basketball player who competed in the 1992 Summer Olympics, in the 1996 Summer Olympics, and in the 2000 Summer Olympics. She was born to an Armenian father and a Russian mother.

References

1970 births
Living people
People from Mary, Turkmenistan
Turkmenistan people of Armenian descent
Russian people of Armenian descent
Russian women's basketball players
Olympic basketball players of the Unified Team
Olympic basketball players of Russia
Basketball players at the 1992 Summer Olympics
Basketball players at the 1996 Summer Olympics
Basketball players at the 2000 Summer Olympics
Olympic gold medalists for the Unified Team
Olympic medalists in basketball
Soviet women's basketball players
Ethnic Armenian sportspeople
Medalists at the 1992 Summer Olympics
Houston Comets players
Charlotte Sting players
Turkmenistan people of Russian descent
Soviet Armenians